John L. Carroll was dean of Cumberland School of Law in Homewood, Alabama from 2001 - 2013. Prior to his appointment as dean, Carroll served for 14 years in the position of Chief U.S. Magistrate Judge for the Middle District of Alabama.  Carroll was also appointed by Chief Justice William Rehnquist to serve on the Judicial Conference's Advisory Committee on Civil Rules.  This Committee analyzes and makes recommendations to United States Supreme Court and the United States Congress on possible modifications to the Federal Rules of Civil Procedure.

Carroll is a native of Washington D.C.  He graduated from Tufts University, then entered the military and served as a Marine Flight Officer during the Vietnam War where he flew over 200 combat missions.

Carroll graduated from Cumberland Law School in 1974, magna cum laude, having served as member of the Cumberland Law Review, on national moot court team and as student bar president.  He also has a master of laws from Harvard University.

After graduation Carroll was named Legal Director of the Southern Poverty Law Center in Montgomery, Alabama.  He also practiced civil and criminal law for 10 years and spent two years on the law faculty at Mercer University's Walter F. George School of Law.

References

Living people
Tufts University alumni
Harvard Law School alumni
Mercer University faculty
American legal scholars
Lawyers from Birmingham, Alabama
Deans of law schools in the United States
Military personnel from Birmingham, Alabama
Year of birth missing (living people)